Bossard is a German language surname. It stems from the male given name Burchard – and may refer to:
Frank Bossard (1912–2001), British fascist 
Roger Bossard (1949), head groundskeeper at Guaranteed Rate Field

References

French-language surnames
Surnames from given names